Gyldendal's Endowment was a literature prize which was awarded in the period 1934–1995 by the Norwegian publisher Gyldendal Norsk Forlag.  The prize was awarded to significant authors, regardless of which publisher the author was associated with.

From 1996 the Gyldendals endowment was superseded by the Gyldendal Prize for "particularly significant writing" and (since 1998) by the Sult-prisen (Hunger Award) for "eminent young authors".

Endowment winners 
1934 – Olav Duun
1935 – Peter Egge, Herman Wildenvey, Arnulf Øverland
1936 – Gabriel Scott
1937 – Cora Sandel
1938 – Arthur Omre
1939 – Johan Falkberget
1940 – Sigurd Christiansen, Ronald Fangen, Sigurd Hoel
1941 – Gunnar Reiss-Andersen, Kristian Elster
1942 – Inge Krokann
1943 – Tarjei Vesaas
1944 – Inger Hagerup
1945 – Johan Borgen
1946 – Emil Boyson, Ernst Orvil, Tore Ørjasæter
1947 – Nils Johan Rud
1948 – Ingeborg Møller, Aksel Sandemose
1949 – Gunnar Larsen, Magnhild Haalke
1950 – Egil Rasmussen, Hans Henrik Holm
1951 – Gunvor Hofmo
1952 – Jakob Sande, Mikkjel Fønhus
1953 – Engvald Bakkan
1954 – Agnar Mykle, Terje Stigen
1955 – Bjørn Rongen, Alfred Hauge
1956 – Sigbjørn Hølmebakk
1957 – Eivind Tverbak, Halldis Moren Vesaas
1958 – Astrid Tollefsen
1959 – Alf Larsen, Åge Rønning
1960 – Finn Bjørnseth
1961 – Johannes Heggland, Per Bronken
1962 – Bergljot Hobæk Haff
1963 – Åsta Holth, Arnold Eidslott, Ola Viker
1964 – Aslaug Låstad Lygre, Odd Hølaas
1965 – Marie Takvam, Gisken Wildenvey
1966 – Georg Johannesen, Odd Winger
1967 – Kåre Holt, Per Hansson
1968 – Jan Erik Vold
1969 – Knut Faldbakken
1970 – Espen Haavardsholm, Sigmund Skard, Merete Wiger
1971 – Tor Obrestad
1972 – Jens Bjørneboe
1973 – Tor Edvin Dahl
1974 – Emil Boyson, Nils Johan Rud, Gunvor Hofmo, Bergljot Hobæk Haff, Tor Åge Bringsværd
1975 – Pål Sundvor
1976 – Finn Carling, Sigurd Evensmo
1977 – Jan Jakob Tønseth
1978 – Olav Nordrå, Arne Ruste
1979 – Cecilie Løveid, Wera Sæther
1980 – Marta Schumann, Tormod Haugen
1981 – Gidske Anderson, Stein Mehren
1982 – Ola Bauer, Ketil Gjessing
1983 – Karin Bang, Terje Johanssen
1984 – Mari Osmundsen, Simen Skjønsberg
1985 – Paal-Helge Haugen, Geir Kjetsaa
1986 – Inger Elisabeth Hansen, Erland Kiøsterud
1987 – Hans Herbjørnsrud, Tor Ulven
1988 – Liv Køltzow, Øystein Lønn
1989 – Edvard Hoem, Gunnar Staalesen
1990 – Sigmund Mjelve, Atle Næss
1991 – Kjartan Fløgstad and Herbjørg Wassmo
1992 – Sissel Lie, Steinar Løding og Tor Fretheim          
1993 – Britt Karin Larsen, Thorvald Steen
1994 – Kjersti Scheen, Bjørn Aamodt           
1995 – Torgrim Eggen, Terje Holtet Larsen

References

Norwegian literary awards